Minuscule 2268 (in the Gregory-Aland numbering), ε 2058 (Soden's numbering), is a Greek minuscule manuscript of the New Testament. Paleographically it has been assigned to the 13th century. Only one leaf of the codex has survived.

Description 

The codex contains a small part of the Gospel of Mark 1:1-14 on 1 parchment leaf (23.4 cm by 16.7 cm). The text is written in one column per page, in 22 lines per page (15.3 by 12 cm).

The titles written in red ink, the initial letters in gold. The text is divided according to the Ammonian Sections, whose numbers are given at the margin, with references to the Eusebian Canons (written below Ammonian Section numbers). It contains pictures (portraits of the four Evangelist). 

Kurt Aland the Greek text of the codex did not place it in any Category.
It was not examined by the Claremont Profile Method.

History 

The codex now is located in the Kenneth Willis Clark Collection of the Duke University (Gk MS 4)  at Durham.

See also 
 List of New Testament minuscules (2001–)
 Textual criticism

References

External links 

 Minuscule 2268 at the Kenneth Willis Clark Collection of Greek Manuscripts 

Greek New Testament minuscules
13th-century biblical manuscripts
Duke University Libraries